The 2017–18 Brunei FA Cup (also known as the DST FA Cup for sponsorship reasons) is the 11th edition of the Brunei FA Cup, the knockout football tournament in Brunei.

First round

|-
!colspan=3|5 November 2017

|-
!colspan=3|12 November 2017

|-
!colspan=3|19 November 2017

|}

Second round

|-
!colspan=3|5 January 2018

|-
!colspan=3|7 January 2018

|-
!colspan=3|9 January 2018

|-
!colspan=3|10 January 2018

|-
!colspan=3|14 January 2018

|-
!colspan=3|4 February 2018

|-
!colspan=3|16 February 2018

|-
!colspan=3|17 February 2018

|}

Quarter-finals

|-
!colspan=3|3 March 2018

|-
!colspan=3|9 March 2018

|-
!colspan=3|10 March 2018

|-
!colspan=3|17 March 2018

|}

Semi-finals

|-
!colspan=3|16 March 2018

|-
!colspan=3|23 March 2018

|}

Final

|-
!colspan=3|1 April 2018

|}

See also
2017–18 Brunei Super League

References

External links
National Football Association of Brunei Darussalam - NFABD Facebook page

Football competitions in Brunei
Brunei
FA Cup
FA Cup